Brit Asia TV is a British television channel that is aimed at the British Asian audience. It launched in 2008 and is known for the Brit Asia TV Music Awards. The channel is available on satellite and publishes videos on Dailymotion and YouTube. Between June 2017 and January 2020 the channel was also available on Virgin Media cable. In August 2017 the channel outsourced its playout operations to ABS Broadcasting. In 2017 the channel changed ownership from brothers Jaz and Davy Bal to a consortium with Tony Shergill as CEO.

The new ownership significantly saved the channel's declining ratings by introducing a new vision for the channel and making the channel available to watch in North America (Canada & America), India, Africa and Australia with monthly viewing figures currently averaging 1 million viewers per month.

In 2018 Brit Asia TV established the Punjabi Film Awards to support and acknowledge the contributions made by Punjabi Cinema, the first of its kind to be held outside of India.  The event saw some of the biggest names from Punjabi Music and Cinema attend such as Gippy Grewal, Sharry Mann, Gurpreet Ghuggi, Satinder Sartaaj, Tarseem Jassar, Jasmin Sandlas and more.

The JW Mariott Grosvenor House Hotel London played host to the BritAsia TV Punjabi Film Awards (PFA) on Saturday, March 30, 2019.The awards celebrated the very best of Punjabi Films during 2018. There were also awards for special recognition and outstanding achievement on the night.

The event saw the likes of Steel Banglez, Jaz Dhami, Sonam Bajwa, Gippy Grewal, Sidhu Moosewala, Harbhajan Mann, Binnu Dhillon in attendance.

Brit Asia TV Music Awards is an annual event held by the channel which has seen some of the biggest artists perform at some of the biggest venues in the world. In 2018 the awards were held in Wembley Arena which saw Sidhu Moose Wala, Mist (rapper) & Stefflon Don. headline with the track 47 produced by Steel Banglez.

It was reported that both Banglez and Sidhu Moose Wala met at the Punjabi Film awards in 2018 and as a result of being in attendance they confirmed the deal for a collaboration then.

In 2019, Brit AsiaTV has announced an exciting new partnership with the Official Charts Company, in launching the world’s first Official Punjabi Chart Show.

Punjabi music consumption has grown exponentially over the last few decades, cementing itself as the dominant South Asian music genre across India. With the roots of modern-day Punjabi music firmly entrenched in the UK, BritAsia TV will be working alongside the Official Charts Company to establish the first Punjabi music chart in the world compiled using official data from all major streaming and download platforms including Apple Music, Spotify and YouTube.

References

Television channels in the United Kingdom